Lagyna is a village and a community of the Lagkadas municipality. Before the 2011 local government reform it was part of the municipality of Lagkadas, of which it was a municipal district. The 2011 census recorded 3,591 inhabitants in the village. The community of Lagyna covers an area of 13.435 km2.

According to the statistics of Vasil Kanchov ("Macedonia, Ethnography and Statistics"), 700 Greek Christians lived in the village in 1900.

See also
 List of settlements in the Thessaloniki regional unit

References

Populated places in Thessaloniki (regional unit)